

eq
Equagesic
Equanil
Equipin

er

erb-ert
erbulozole (INN)
Ercatab
erdosteine (INN)
Ergamisol (Janssen Pharmaceutica)
ergocalciferol (INN)
Ergoloid Mesylates
Ergomar
ergometrine (INN)
Ergostat
ergotamine (INN)
eribaxaban (USAN, INN)
eribulin (INN) (investigational drug)
ericolol (INN)
eritoran tetrasodium (USAN)
eritrityl tetranitrate (INN)
erizepine (INN)
erlizumab (INN)
erlotinib hydrochloride (USAN)
ertapenem sodium (USAN)
ertiprotafib (USAN)
ertumaxomab (INN)
erocainide (INN)
Errin
ersentilide (INN)
ersofermin (INN)
Ertaczo
ertumaxomab (INN)

ery
Ery-Tab
Eryc
Erycette
Eryderm
Erygel
Erymax
Erypar
Eryped
Erythra-Derm
Erythro-Statin
Erythrocin
erythromycin acistrate (INN)
erythromycin stinoprate (INN)
erythromycin (INN)
Eryzole

es

esa-esr
esafloxacin (INN)
esaprazole (INN)
escitalopram (INN)
Esclim (Groupe Fournier)
esculamine (INN)
eseridine (INN)
esflurbiprofen (INN)
Esgic
Esidrix
Esimil
Eskalith
esketamine (INN)
eslicarbazepine (USAN)
esmirtazapine (USAN, INN)
esmolol (INN)
esomeprazole (INN)
esorubicin (INN)
esoxybutynin chloride (USAN)
espatropate (INN)
esproquine (INN)
esreboxetine (USAN, INN)

est

esta-esti
Estazolam
estazolam (INN)
Esterified Estrogens
Estinyl

estr
Estrace
Estraderm
estradiol acetate (USAN)
estradiol benzoate (INN)
estradiol undecylate (INN)
estradiol valerate (INN)
Estradiol
estradiol (INN)
Estradurin
Estraguard
estramustine (INN)
estrapronicate (INN)
Estrasorb
Estratab
estrazinol (INN)
Estring
estriol succinate (INN)
estrofurate (INN)
Estrogel
Estrogenic Substance
estrone (INN)
Estrostep
Estrovis

esu-esz
esuprone (INN)
eszopiclone (USAN)